The Biloxi River is a stream in the U.S. state of Mississippi.

The Biloxi River is named for the Biloxi Indians, but the ultimate meaning of the word "Biloxi" is obscure. Variant names are "Oka Chambala River" and "Viloxy River".

References

Rivers of Mississippi
Rivers of Harrison County, Mississippi
Rivers of Stone County, Mississippi
Mississippi placenames of Native American origin